Milagres Church may refer to:
 Milagres Church (Kallianpur), a Catholic church in Kallianpur
 Milagres Church (Mangalore), a Catholic church in Mangalore